Kerala House Udan Vilpanakku is a 2004 Malayalam-language comedy drama film directed by Thaha and starring Jayasurya, Harisree Asokan, Cochin Hanifa and Narendra Prasad. The film deals with the problems faced by the protagonist in selling his property which is located in Kerala-Tamil Nadu border in Walayar. It was panned by the critics as well as audience.

Plot
The movie tells story of Dineshan Kondody, who tries to sell a house which situates in Kerala-Tamil Nadu border, only to liquidate his all debts.

Cast
 Jayasurya as Dineshan Kondody
 Harisree Asokan as Vallabhan
 Cochin Hanifa as Vadival Vasu
 Rathi Arumugam as Sundari
 Thalaivasal Vijay as Periya Thevar
 Narendra Prasad as Paramu Nair
 Sridevika as Paramu Nair's daughter Damayanti
 Salim Kumar as Tester Kannappan
 Geetha Salam as Ammavan
 Kovai Sarala as Parvathi Ammal
Narayanankutty as snake charmer
 Sai Kumar as Mahendran Kondody
 Bala Singh as Chinna Thevar
 Manian Pillai Raju as Pisharadi
 Sadiq as Polce Inspector Idiyan Thomas

References

External links
 

2000s Malayalam-language films
2004 comedy-drama films
2004 films
Indian comedy-drama films
Films shot in Palakkad